Zhu Zhifu (born 29 January 1979) is a Chinese rower. He competed in the men's lightweight double sculls event at the 2004 Summer Olympics.

References

1979 births
Living people
Chinese male rowers
Olympic rowers of China
Rowers at the 2004 Summer Olympics
Rowers from Jiangxi
Asian Games medalists in rowing
Rowers at the 2002 Asian Games
Asian Games gold medalists for China
Medalists at the 2002 Asian Games
People from Shangrao
20th-century Chinese people
21st-century Chinese people